The Cégep de Sherbrooke is a public pre-university college located in the city of Sherbrooke, Quebec, Canada. Its website indicates that it has an annual student population of more than 6,500 and over 750 paid staff members.

History
  
The college traces its origins to the merger of several institutions which became public ones in 1967, when the Quebec system of CEGEPs was created.

Campus
The  campus includes 6 academic pavilions, academic laboratories, a sport centre (le Cap), a theatre (Alfred-Des Rochers), a residence, and plenty of green space. An agricultural centre is located in Coaticook.

Programs
The college offers two types of programs: pre-university and technical. The pre-university programs, which take two years to complete, cover the subject matters which roughly correspond to the additional year of high school given elsewhere in Canada in preparation for a chosen field in university. The technical programs, which take three years to complete, applies to students who wish to be career-ready; however, many students choose to pursue a university degree. In addition, the Continuing Education Centre offers a wide variety of credit courses and programs with flexible scheduling.

Partnerships
The College of General and Vocational Education is affiliated with the ACCC, and CCAA.

Athletics
The college participates in the Canadian Colleges Athletic Association,

See also
List of colleges in Quebec
Higher education in Quebec

External links
Cégep de Sherbrooke

References

Sherbrooke
Education in Sherbrooke
Buildings and structures in Sherbrooke